Andrew Thompson was an English professional footballer who played as a winger for Sunderland.

References

Footballers from Sunderland
English footballers
Association football wingers
Sunderland West End F.C. players
Sunderland A.F.C. players
Queens Park Rangers F.C. players
English Football League players
Year of birth missing
Year of death missing